Jacques Morcos is a professor of neurosurgery in the Department of Neurological Surgery and Otolaryngology at the University of Miami and serves as the director of skull base and endoscopic surgery and cerebrovascular surgery. Morcos' training began in London at the National Hospital for Neurology and Neurosurgery at Queen's Square and Maida Vale in London, England.   He completed his residency at the University of Minnesota and his fellowships at the University of Florida and the premiere Barrow Neurological Institute. 

He has received numerous awards from the Royal College of Surgeons of Edinburgh, the American Board of Neurological Surgery, and is currently director of the North American Skull Base Society. He serves as an editor for numerous journals including World Neurosurgery and Journal of Neurosurgery and has chaired several international committees on neurological surgery. He has authored over 105 peer-reviewed journals and has given over 200 presentations worldwide.  His research interests include vascular neuroanatomy and microsurgical techniques.

References

External links 
 neurosurgery.med.miami.edu

Year of birth missing (living people)
Living people
American neurologists
American neurosurgeons
University of Miami faculty
University of Florida fellows